Jack Owens (born April 3, 1977) is the former head coach of the Miami RedHawks men's basketball team. He is currently the Assistant coach under Chris Holtmann for the Ohio State Buckeyes basketball team.

Head coaching record

References

External links
Purdue Boilermakers bio
Miami RedHawks bio

1977 births
Living people
American men's basketball coaches
American men's basketball players
Basketball coaches from Indiana
Basketball players from Indianapolis
College men's basketball head coaches in the United States
Eastern Illinois Panthers men's basketball coaches
Eastern Illinois Panthers men's basketball players
Junior college men's basketball coaches in the United States
Junior college men's basketball players in the United States
Miami RedHawks men's basketball coaches
Murray State Racers men's basketball players
Purdue Boilermakers men's basketball coaches
Southern Illinois Salukis men's basketball coaches
Guards (basketball)